Tony Silvestri is the name of:

Charles Anthony Silvestri (born 1965), American lyricist, poet and historian
Tony Silvestri, former owner of Bournemouth, England, music venue The Downstairs Club
Tony Silvestri, member of 2000s team Boston Storm (inline hockey)
Tony Silvestri, "Touring musician" playing piano, acoustic guitar (2015–2016) with Canadian rock band The Glorious Sons